The 2016 Peach Bowl was a college football bowl game played on December 31, 2016 at the Georgia Dome in Atlanta, Georgia. It was one of the 2016–17 bowl games concluding the 2016 FBS football season. The 49th Peach Bowl was a College Football Playoff semifinal, with the winner of this game advancing to play the winner of the 2016 Fiesta Bowl in the 2017 College Football Playoff National Championship. This was the final edition of the Peach Bowl (and final college football game) contested in the Georgia Dome, as the stadium was demolished on November 20, 2017 after its replacement, Mercedes-Benz Stadium, opened on August 26 of the same year.

Sponsored by Chick-fil-A, the game was officially known as the College Football Playoff Semifinal at the Chick-fil-A Peach Bowl. The game was televised on ESPN with a radio broadcast on ESPN Radio. The winner of the game received the George P. Crumbley Trophy, named for the founder of the original Peach Bowl.

Teams

On December 4, 2016, the CFP Semifinals were announced, with #1 Alabama vs. #4 Washington playing in the Peach Bowl.

This was the fifth meeting between the schools, with Alabama having won all four previous encounters. Their most recent meeting was at the 1986 Sun Bowl, where the Crimson Tide defeated the Huskies by a score of 28–6.

This was the first bowl game between a Pac-12 team and an SEC team (or a predecessor conference) since the 2011 BCS National Championship Game when the Auburn Tigers defeated the Oregon Ducks by a score of 22–19 on a last-second field goal, and the second since the 1989 Freedom Bowl when the Washington Huskies defeated the Florida Gators 34–7.  This was also Alabama's first appearance in the Peach Bowl, as well the first appearance of a Pac-12 team (although Arizona State appeared in the 1970 Peach Bowl as a member of the Western Athletic Conference).

Game summary

Both teams went three-and-out to start the game. Washington scored a touchdown on an eight-play, 64-yard drive that culminated in a 16-yard receiving touchdown pass from Jake Browning to Dante Pettis to make the score 7–0. Alabama answered on a nine-play, 78-yard drive that resulted in a Bo Scarbrough 18-yard rushing touchdown to tie the game. On the next drive, Washington got one first down before a John Ross fumble gave the ball to the Crimson Tide on the Washington 40-yard line. Alabama ran six plays for 17 yards and scored on an Adam Griffith 41-yard field goal to make the score 10–7. Washington and Alabama traded punts over the next six drives. On Washington's next drive, they earned a first down before Browning threw a pick six to Ryan Anderson, which was returned 26 yards for a touchdown to make it 17–7. On the next drive, Washington ran six plays to close out the first half. Alabama started the third quarter with the ball but punted. Washington went three-and-out on their first possession of the second half. The teams traded punts over four possessions before Alabama got the ball back early in the fourth quarter on their own 2-yard line. Alabama made it to their own 32-yard line over five plays, which included a 12-yard run from Scarborough and a 16-yard reception from O. J. Howard. On the next play, Scarborough broke free on a 68-yard rushing touchdown to make the score 24–7. The teams traded punts over the next three possessions. In an effort to run some clock, Alabama ran six plays and burned two of Washington's timeouts before turning the ball over on downs. On their final possession, Washington was able to get the ball into Alabama territory after a 16-yard reception and a 12-yard reception by Aaron Fuller. However, a sack by Rashaan Evans on Browning halted their momentum. On their final play, Browning was intercepted by Minkah Fitzpatrick. After committing two unsportsmanlike conduct penalties, Alabama ran out the clock on a kneel down to end the game with a 24–7 victory.

Scoring summary

Statistics

References

2016–17 NCAA football bowl games
2016–17 College Football Playoff
2016
2016
2016
December 2016 sports events in the United States
2016 in sports in Georgia (U.S. state)
2016 in Atlanta